Olympique de Marseille extended their titleless run to 15 years – but had a decent season, where they qualified for the UEFA Champions League for the second year running, and won away from home in the 2007–08 tournament at Anfield against 2007 finalists Liverpool, but a 4–0 defeat at Stade Vélodrome in the last round knocked OM out of the tournament. Having sold Franck Ribéry to Bayern Munich for around 30 million euros, the stage was set for Marseille to push the boundaries financially in the coming seasons, with investments in the playing squad long overdue for a club that had been known as a club selling players expensively rather than buying.

Squad
As of February 1, 2008.

Transfers 

In:

 

Out:

Competitions

Ligue 1

League table

Results summary

Results by round

Matches

UEFA Champions League

Group stage

UEFA Cup

Knockout phase

Round of 32

Round of 16

References

Sources
 – Footballsquads – Marseille 2007/2008 7
 – LFP.fr – Ligue de Football Profesionel

Olympique de Marseille seasons
Marseille